Dominicans in Spain from the Dominican Republic make up about 1.66% of all foreigners in Spain, this includes immigrants and people of Dominican descent born in Spain. The first country of destination for Dominicans in Europe is Spain, and it is the country with the most Dominican migrants outside of the United States.

History
Spain is the primary country for Dominicans immigrating to Europe. A first group traveled to pursue university studies, after they were awarded grants by the government of Juan Bosch. After the Dominican Civil War of 1965, a second exodus broke and nearly 2,000 Dominicans decided to reside in the "motherland".

There are direct flights between both nations with the following airlines: Air Europa, Evelop Airlines, Iberia, and Wamos Air.

Dominican-Spanish relations
Throughout the years, both nations have signed numerous bilateral agreements such as a Treaty of Recognition, Peace, Friendships, Commerce, Navigation and Extradition (1855); Agreement on Literary, Artistic and Scientific Property (1930); Agreement on Hispanic-Dominican Emigration (1956); Agreement on Dual-Nationality (1968); Air Transportation Agreement (1968); Agreement on Economic Cooperation (1973); Extradition and Judicial Assistance Treaty (1981); Agreement on Scientific and Technical Cooperation (1988); Agreement on Cultural and Educational Cooperation (1988); Agreement on Reciprocal Protection and Promotion of Investments (1996); Agreement on the Regulation of Migrant Laborers (2001); Social Security Agreement (2004) and an Agreement on the Avoidance of Double-Taxation (2014).

 Dominican Republic has an embassy in Madrid and consulates-general in Barcelona and Santa Cruz de Tenerife and consulates in Seville and Valencia.
 Spain has an embassy in Santo Domingo.

Gallery of Dominican people in Spain

See also

 Dominican Republic–Spain relations
 History of the Dominican Republic
 Captaincy General of Santo Domingo

References

External links

Ethnic groups in Spain
 
Dominican Republic diaspora